The 2011 MuchMusic Video Awards was held in Toronto, Ontario, Canada at MuchMusic's headquarters on June 19, 2011. The awards were aired on MuchMusic, CP24, E!, MuchHD and Fuse. Along with the MuchMusic VJ's, it was confirmed on the MuchMusic website that Selena Gomez will host the show. Lady Gaga and Justin Bieber tied for the most awards won with 2 each.

Winners and nominees
Nominees for the People's Choice awards were announced in early May 2011. One "wildcard" nominee will be chosen in each of the "UR Fave" award categories (as voted by the Much Music viewers). The nominees were, with the winners in bold:

Video of the Year
 Shawn Desman — "Electric/Night Like This"
 Blake McGrath — "Relax"
 Danny Fernandes f. Belly — "Automatic"
 Down With Webster — "Whoa Is Me"
 Fefe Dobson — "Ghost"

Post Production of the Year
 Danny Fernandes f. Belly — "Automatic"
 Broken Social Scene — "Forced to Love"
 Candy Coated Killahz — "Neon Black"
 K'naan — "Take a Minute"
 These Kids Wear Crowns — "Jumpstart"

Cinematographer of the Year
 Blake McGrath — "Relax"
 JDiggz f. Neverending White Lights – "This Time"
 Kaskade f. Dragonette – "Fire In Your New Shoes"
 Stereos – "Uncontrollable"
 Neverest – "Everything"

Director of the Year
 You Say Party – "Lonely's Lunch" Director: Sean Wainsteim
 Abandon All Ships – "Geeving" Director: Davin Black JDiggz f. Neverending White Lights – "This Time" Director: RT!
 Marianas Trench f. Jessica Lee – "Good to You" Director: Colin Minihan
 Shawn Desman — "Electric/Night Like This" Director: RT!

Pop Video of the Year
 Down With Webster – "Whoa Is Me" Alyssa Reid f. P. Reign – "Alone Again"
 Fefe Dobson – "Ghost"
 Marianas Trench f. Jessica Lee – "Good to You"
 Shawn Desman — "Electric/Night Like This"

MuchLOUD Rock Video of the Year
 Abandon All Ships – "Geeving" Billy Talent – "Diamond on a Landmine"
 Hail the Villain – "Runaway"
 Metric – "Stadium Love"
 Simple Plan f. Rivers Cuomo – "Can't Keep My Hands Off You"

MuchVIBE Hip-hop Video of the Year
 Classified – "That Ain't Classy" Belly f. Kobe – "Back Against The Wall"
 K'naan — "Take a Minute"
 P. Reign – "Call My Name"
 Shad – "Rose Garden"

MuchFACT Indie Video of the Year
 JDiggz f. Neverending White Lights – "This Time" JRDN – "Like Magic"
 Metric – "Stadium Love"
 Tokyo Police Club – "Wait Up (Boots of Danger)"
 You Say Party – "Lonely's Lunch"

International Video of the Year – Artist
 Lady Gaga – "Judas" Bruno Mars – "Just the Way You Are"
 David Guetta f. Rihanna - "Who's That Chick"
 Eminem f. Rihanna – "Love the Way You Lie"
 Katy Perry f. Kanye West – "E.T."
 Kanye West f. Pusha T – "Runaway"
 Rihanna – "Only Girl (In The World)"
 Britney Spears – "Till The World Ends"
 Jennifer Lopez f. Pitbull – "On The Floor"
 Selena Gomez & The Scene - "A Year Without Rain"

International Video of the Year – Group
 Far East Movement f. The Cataracs, Dev – "Like a G6" The Black Eyed Peas – "The Time (Dirty Bit)"
 Diddy-Dirty Money – "Coming Home"
 The Black Keys – "Tighten Up"
 White Lies – "Bigger than Us"

International Video of the Year by a Canadian
 Tie: Drake – "Find Your Love" and Justin Bieber ft. Usher – "Somebody to Love (Remix)" Arcade Fire – "The Suburbs"
 Avril Lavigne – "What the Hell"
 Fefe Dobson – "Stuttering"

MuchMUSIC.COM Most Watched Video
 Taio Cruz - "Dynamite" Adam Lambert – "If I Had You"
 B.o.B ft. Hayley Williams - "Airplanes"
 Beyoncé - "Why Don't You Love Me"
 Bruno Mars – "Just the Way You Are"
 Christina Aguilera - "Not Myself Tonight"
 Drake ft. Lil Wayne - "Miss Me"
 Drake - "Find Your Love"
 Eminem ft. Lil Wayne - "No Love"
 Edward Maya ft. Vika Jigulina- "Stereo Love"
 Eminem ft. Rihanna – "Love the Way You Lie"
 Justin Bieber ft. Usher – "Somebody To Love (Remix)"
 Katy Perry ft. Snoop Dogg – "California Gurls"
 Katy Perry – "Teenage Dream"
 Kesha – "Your Love Is My Drug"
 Kesha – "Take It Off"
 Lady Gaga – "Alejandro"
 Marianas Trench ft. Jessica Lee – "Good To You"
 Nelly – "Just A Dream"
 P!nk – "Raise Your Glass"
 Rihanna – "Only Girl (In The World)"
 Selena Gomez and the Scene – "A Year Without Rain"
 Taylor Swift– "Mine"
 Usher ft. Pitbull – "DJ Got Us Fallin' in Love"
 Avril Lavigne - "Smile"

UR Fave: Video
 Fefe Dobson - "Stuttering" Down With Webster - "Whoa Is Me"
 Shawn Desman - "Electric/Night Like This"
 Danny Fernandes f. Belly - "Automatic"
 (Wildcard Winner) These Kids Wear Crowns - "Jumpstart"

UR Fave: International Video
 Lady Gaga — "Born This Way" Bruno Mars — "Just the Way You Are"
 Eminem ft. Rihanna — "Love The Way You Lie"
 Selena Gomez — "A Year Without Rain"
 Britney Spears - "Till The World Ends"

UR Fave: Artist
 Justin Bieber ft. Usher  — "Somebody to Love (Remix)"' Arcade Fire — "The Suburbs"
 Avril Lavigne — "What The Hell"
 Drake — "Find Your Love"
 Down With Webster - "Whoa Is Me" (Wildcard Winner)

PerformersThe following performances are in chronological order.''

 Lady Gaga - The Edge of Glory
 Far East Movement featuring Dev and Snoop Dogg - Like a G6, If I Was You (OMG), & Bass Down Low
 Down With Webster - She's Dope
 Fefe Dobson - Stuttering
 The Black Keys - Howlin' for You
 Avril Lavigne - What the Hell 
 Simple Plan featuring Fefe Dobson - Jet Lag
 Selena Gomez & The Scene - Who Says
 City and Colour - Fragile Bird
 Bruno Mars - Just the Way You Are
 Lady Gaga - Born This Way

Appearances
 Foster The People
 Nikki Reed
 Ian Somerhalder
 Nina Dobrev
 Shay Mitchell
 Johnny Galecki
 These Kids Wear Crowns
 Shawn Desman
 Marianas Trench (band)
 Munro Chambers
 Cody Simpson
 Classified
 Blake McGrath
 Colin Farrell
 Kat Graham
 Justin Bieber
 Trevor Donovan

References

External links
 

MuchMusic Video Awards
Muchmusic Video Awards
Muchmusic Video Awards
Muchmusic Video Awards